This is a list of lighthouses in Iran.

Lighthouses

See also 
 Lists of lighthouses

References

External links 

 

Iran
Lighthouses
Lighthouses